A nuclear flask is a shipping container that is used to transport active nuclear materials between nuclear power station and spent fuel reprocessing facilities.

Each shipping container is designed to maintain its integrity under normal transportation conditions and during hypothetical accident conditions. They must protect their contents against damage from the outside world, such as impact or fire. They must also contain their contents from leakage, both for physical leakage and for radiological shielding.

Spent nuclear fuel shipping casks are used to transport spent nuclear fuel used in nuclear power plants and research reactors to disposal sites such as the nuclear reprocessing center at COGEMA La Hague site.

International

United Kingdom

Railway-carried flasks are used to transport spent fuel from nuclear power stations in the UK and the Sellafield spent nuclear fuel reprocessing facility.

Over the past 35 years, British Nuclear Fuels plc (BNFL) and its subsidiary PNTL have conducted over 14,000 cask shipments of SNF worldwide, transporting more than 9,000 tonnes of SNF over 16 million miles via road, rail, and sea without a radiological release. BNFL designed, licensed, and currently own and operate a fleet of approximately 170 casks of the Excellox design. BNFL has maintained a fleet of transport casks to ship
SNF for the United Kingdom, continental Europe, and Japan for reprocessing.

In the UK a series of public demonstrations were conducted in which spent fuel flasks (loaded with steel bars) were subjected to simulated accident conditions. A randomly selected flask (never used for holding used fuel) from the production line was first dropped from a tower. The flask was dropped in such a way that the weakest part of it would hit the ground first. The lid of the flask was slightly damaged but very little material escaped from the flask. A little water escaped from the flask but it was thought that in a real accident that the escape of radioactivity associated with this water would not be a threat to humans or their environment.

For a second test the same flask was fitted with a new lid, filled again with steel bars and water before a train was driven into it at high speed. The flask survived with only cosmetic damage while the train was destroyed. Although referred to as a test, the actual stresses the flask underwent were well below what they are designed to withstand, as much of the energy from the collision was absorbed by the train and also in moving the flask some distance.
This flask is on display at the training center at Heysham 1 Power Station.

Description
Introduced in the early 1960s, Magnox flasks consists of four layers; an internal skip containing the waste; guides and protectors surrounding the skip; all contained within the  steel main body of flask itself, with characteristic cooling fins; and (since the early 1990s) a transport cabin of panels which provide an external housing.  Flasks for waste from the later advanced gas cooled reactor power stations are similar, but have thinner steel main walls at  thickness, to allow room for extensive internal lead shielding. The flask is protected by a bolt hasp which prevents the content from being accessed during transit.

Transport
All the flasks are owned by the Nuclear Decommissioning Authority, the owners of Direct Rail Services. A train conveying flasks would be hauled by two locomotives, either Class 20 or Class 37, but Class 66 and Class 68 locomotives are increasingly being used; locomotives are used in pairs as a precaution in case one fails en route. Greenpeace protest that flasks in rail transit pose a hazard to passengers standing on platforms, although many tests performed by the Health and Safety Executive have proved that it is safe for passengers to stand on the platform while a flask passes by.

Safety

However, critics  consider the testing flawed for various reasons. Nevertheless, there have been several accidents involving flasks, including derailments, collisions, and even a flask being dropped during transfer from train to road, with no leakage having occurred.

Problems have been found where flasks "sweat", when small amounts of radioactive material absorbed into paint migrate to the surface, causing contamination risks.  Studies  identified that 10–15% of flasks in the United Kingdom were suffering from this problem, but none exceeded the international recommended safety limits. Similar flasks in mainland Europe were found to marginally exceed the contamination limits during testing, and additional monitoring procedures were put into place. In order to reduce the risk, current UK flask wagons are fitted with a lockable cover to ensure any surface contamination remains within the container, and all containers are tested before shipment, with those exceeding the safety level being cleaned until they are within the limit. A report in 2001 identified potential risks, and actions to be taken to ensure safety.

United States

In the United States, the acceptability of the design of each cask is judged against Title 10, Part 71, of the Code of Federal Regulations (other nations' shipping casks, possibly excluding Russia's, are designed and tested to similar standards (International Atomic Energy Agency "Regulations for the Safe Transport of Radioactive Material" No. TS-R-1)). The designs must demonstrate (possibly by computer modelling) protection against radiological release to the environment under all four of the following hypothetical accident conditions, designed to encompass 99% of all accidents: 
A 9-meter (30 ft) free fall onto an unyielding surface
A puncture test allowing the container to free-fall 1 meter (about 39 inches) onto a steel rod 15 centimeters (about 6 inches) in diameter
A 30-minute, all-engulfing fire at 800 degrees Celsius (1475 degrees Fahrenheit)
An 8-hour immersion under 0.9 meter (3 ft) of water.
Further, an undamaged package must be subjected to a one-hour immersion under 200 meters (655 ft) of water.

In addition, between 1975 and 1977 Sandia National Laboratories conducted full-scale crash tests on spent nuclear fuel shipping casks. Although the casks were damaged, none would have leaked.

Although the U.S. Department of Transportation (DOT) has the primary responsibility for regulating the safe transport of radioactive materials in the United States, the Nuclear Regulatory Commission (NRC) requires that licensees and carriers involved in spent fuel shipments:
Follow only approved routes;
Provide armed escorts for heavily populated areas;
Use immobilization devices;
Provide monitoring and redundant communications;
Coordinate with law enforcement agencies before shipments; and
Notify in advance the NRC and States through which the shipments will pass.

Since 1965, approximately 3,000 shipments of spent nuclear fuel have been transported safely over the U.S.'s highways, waterways, and railroads.

Baltimore train tunnel fire

On July 18, 2001, a freight train carrying hazardous (non-nuclear) materials derailed and caught fire while passing through the Howard Street railroad tunnel in downtown Baltimore, Maryland, United States. The fire burned for 3 days, with temperatures as high as 1000 °C (1800 °F). Since the casks are designed for a 30-minute fire at 800 °C (1475 °F), several reports have been made regarding the inability of the casks to survive a fire similar to the Baltimore one. However, nuclear waste would never be transported together with hazardous (flammable or explosive) materials on the same train or track.

State of Nevada
The State of Nevada, USA, released a report entitled, "Implications of the Baltimore Rail Tunnel Fire for Full-Scale Testing of Shipping Casks" on February 25, 2003. In the report, they said a hypothetical spent nuclear fuel accident based on the Baltimore fire:

"Concluded steel-lead-steel cask would have failed after 6.3 hours; monolithic steel cask would have failed after 11-12.5 hours."
"Contaminated Area: 32 square miles (82 km2)"
"Latent cancer fatalities: 4,000-28,000 over 50 years (200-1,400 during first year)"
"Cleanup cost: $13.7 Billion (2001 Dollars)"

National Academy of Sciences
The National Academy of Sciences, at the request of the State of Nevada, produced a report on July 25, 2003. The report concluded that the following should be done:

"Need to 3-D model (bolts, seals, etc) more than HI-STAR cask for extreme fire environments."
"For safety and risk analysis, casks should be physically tested to destruction."
"NRC should release all thermal calculations; Holtec is withholding allegedly proprietary information."

NRC
The U.S. Nuclear Regulatory Commission released a report in November 2006. It concluded:

The results of this evaluation also strongly indicate that neither spent nuclear fuel (SNF) particles nor fission products would be released from a spent fuel transportation package carrying intact spent fuel involved in a severe tunnel fire such as the Baltimore tunnel fire. None of the three package designs analyzed for the Baltimore tunnel fire scenario (TN-68, HI-STAR 100, and NAC LWT) experienced internal temperatures that would result in rupture of the fuel cladding. Therefore, radioactive material (i.e., SNF particles or fission products) would be retained within the fuel rods.
There would be no release from the HI-STAR 100, because the inner welded canister remains leak tight. While a release is unlikely, the potential releases calculated for the TN-68 rail package and the NAC LWT truck package indicate that any release of CRUD from either package would be very small - less than an A2 quantity.

Canada
By comparison there has been limited spent nuclear fuel transport in Canada. Transportation casks have been designed for truck and rail transport and Canada's regulatory body, the Canadian Nuclear Safety Commission, granted approval for casks, which may be used for barge shipments as well. The commission's regulations prohibit the disclosure of location, routing and timing of shipments of nuclear materials, such as spent fuel.

International maritime transport
Nuclear flasks containing spent nuclear fuel are sometimes transported by sea for the purposes of reprocessing or relocation to a storage facility. Vessels receiving these cargoes are variously classified INF-1, INF-2 or INF-3 by the International Maritime Organisation. The code was introduced as a voluntary system in 1993 and became mandatory in 2001. The "INF" acronym stands for "Irradiated Nuclear Fuel" though the classification also covers "plutonium and high-level waste" cargoes. In order to receive these classifications, vessels must meet a range of structural and safety standards. Vessels used for the transportation of spent nuclear fuel are typically purpose built and are commonly referred to as Nuclear Fuel Carriers. The global fleet includes vessels under flags of the United Kingdom, Japan, Russian Federation, China and Sweden.

See also
Dry cask storage
Nuclear reprocessing
Radioactive waste
Safeguards Transporter
Spent fuel pool

References

External links 

Nuclear Transports in Britain (1999), Cumbrians Opposed to a Radioactive Environment
Crash! Pictures of the 1984 train-crash test
Train test crash 1984 BBC News footage of the 1984 train-crash test.
Operation Smash Hit Publicity film made for the CEGB (subsequently Magnox Electric Ltd) about the train-crash test
Risks of transporting of irradiated fuel and nuclear materials in the UK, Large & Associates, for Greenpeace (2007)
Background Report on the Basic Issues to be Addressed, QuantSci Limited, for the Greater London Authority (2001)
U.S. Transport Council
Nuclear Regulatory Commission "Safety of Spent Fuel Transportation" (NUREG/BR-0292)
Nuclear Regulatory Commission Backgrounder on Transportation of Spent Fuel and Radioactive Materials
Pro-nuclear group's summary
Fuel Solutions Inc.(BFS), the world’s largest shippers of nuclear materials
World Nuclear Transport Institute

Radioactive waste
Shipping containers
Hazardous materials